Daniil Aleksandrovich Grigoryev (born 16 March 2002) is a Russian football player. He plays for SKA-Khabarovsk.

Club career
He made his debut in the Russian Football National League for Alania Vladikavkaz on 6 March 2022 in a game against FC Tekstilshchik Ivanovo.

References

External links
 
 
 
 Profile by Russian Football National League

2002 births
People from Belgorod
Sportspeople from Belgorod Oblast
Living people
Russian footballers
Association football midfielders
A.C. Prato players
FC SKA-Khabarovsk players
Russian First League players
Russian Second League players
Russian expatriate footballers
Expatriate footballers in Italy
Russian expatriate sportspeople in Italy